Stefan Beuse (Münster, 31 January 1967) is a German writer.

Biography 
After Abitur, he worked for several publications like Die Zeit or Die Welt. He has won several literature prices like Literaturförderpreis der Stadt Hamburg.

He lives with his family in Hamburg.

Works 
 Wir schießen Gummibänder zu den Sternen, Leipzig: Reclam 1997
 Kometen, Köln: Kiepenheuer und Witsch 2000
 Gebrauchsanweisung für Hamburg, München: Piper 2001
 Die Nacht der Könige, München: Piper 2002
 Meeres Stille, München: Piper 2003
 Lautlos – sein letzter Auftrag, Frankfurt am Main: Fischer-Taschenbuch-Verlag 2004
 Alles was du siehst, München: Beck 2009

External links 
 
 

1967 births
Living people

German male writers